Hermaville is a commune in the Pas-de-Calais department in the Hauts-de-France region of France.

Geography

Population

Places of interest
 The church of St. Georges, dating from the seventeenth century.
 The chateau, dating from the eighteenth century.
 Traces of an old castle, destroyed in 1640 by the French.

See also
Communes of the Pas-de-Calais department

References

External links

 Commune website

Communes of Pas-de-Calais